Frank Golding (14 August 1890 – 3 September 1966) was an Australian rules footballer who played with Sturt in the South Australian Football League (SAFL).

References

External links 		
Frank Golding's profile at AustralianFootball.com
Frank Golding Hall of Fame profile at SANFL 	

	

Sturt Football Club players
1890 births
1966 deaths
Australian rules footballers from Western Australia
Australian Rules footballers: place kick exponents
South Australian Football Hall of Fame inductees